In Hinduism, the Ananta Samhita is a recently created scripture, authored by Ananta Vasudeva, a disciple of Srila Bhaktisiddhanta Sarasvati Thakur, founder of the Gaudiya Math. It is supposed to be a Pancaratra agama, part of the Pancaratra corpus known collectively as the "Narada Pancaratra" among Gaudiya Vaisnavas. Please see https://gosai.com/writings/greater-than-the-upanisads-and-the-vedas where Srila Sridhara deva Goswami of Sarasvata Gaudiya Math confirms this book was written by his godbrother Ananta Vasudeva.

However, a work of this name is quoted by Bhaktivinoda Thakura, preceding Ananta Vasudeva by two generations, in his Sri Navadvipa Mahatmya, ch. 2, and Bhaktisiddhanta Sarasvati Thakur, the guru of Ananta Vasudeva, in his commentary to Chaitanya Bhagavata 1.1.46.
It's also quoted by Ishana Nagara, the household servant of Sacimata, in Advaita Prakasha, ch. 4 and 10.

Hindu texts